The Khama III Memorial Museum is a museum located in Serowe, Botswana. The museum is dedicated to the history of the Khama family and Serowe.

History 

In 1985, the museum was opened for the first time by several people from Serowe, Lenyetse Seretse donated his house for the museum. The museum house was built around 1910. The intention with creating this museum was to promote cultural pride in Serowe. After Bessie Head's death, the museum acquired several of her papers, including notes and sketches as well as writings. The museum has produced an occasional journal called Lekgapho, which is distributed widely around Botswana. In 2006, Bessie Head's room was installed in the museum, as well as permanent exhibits about the writer. In July 2013, the Bessie Head Society in collaboration with the museum organized a symposium in Serowe to commemorate the anniversary of the publication of Bessie's book, A Question of Power. In 2014, the U.S. government donated $78000 (71000 pula) to preserve the museum's artifacts which include Khama family manuscripts and Bessie's literary works. The British High Commissioner to Botswana, Katy Ransome visited some of Serowe's historical sites in August 2016, including the museum. The Norwegian Agency for Development Cooperation and Danish Volunteer Service have financially supported the museum. In October 2018, Cuba's ambassador to Botswana, Patricia L. Pego Guerra, visited the museum.

Collections 
The museum contains archives about the Khama family. The museum contains musical instruments from the eastern Kalahari. The museum contains ethnographic artifacts from Bangwato merafe, these artifacts date back to the time of Khaima III. Among the museum's exhibits include correspondence, uniforms and furniture, in addition to exhibits on snakes and animals native to Africa. The museum also has artifacts about the culture of the San people and the museum contains temporary art displays. The museum contains photographs of the funeral of Botswana's first president, Seretse Khama. In addition, the museum has also preserved historical Botswana uniforms.

References 

Museums in Botswana